Ruslan Rzayev (born 24 January 1998) is a Russian football player. He plays for FC SKA Rostov-on-Don.

Club career
He made his debut in the Russian Professional Football League for FC Krasnodar-2 on 29 July 2016 in a game against FC Sochi. He made his Russian Football National League debut for Krasnodar-2 on 4 August 2018 in a game against FC Tyumen.

On 11 June 2019, he joined FC Armavir on loan.

References

External links
 
 

1998 births
Living people
People from Bataysk
Sportspeople from Rostov Oblast
Russian footballers
Russian sportspeople of Azerbaijani descent
Azerbaijani expatriate footballers
Association football midfielders
Association football forwards
FC Krasnodar players
FC Armavir players
FC Krasnodar-2 players
FC SKA Rostov-on-Don players